This is a list of the 509 public school districts in the U.S. state of Oklahoma. Of those, 415 are independent school districts that offer first grade through 12th grade classes. There are 94 dependent school districts which serve students at lower grade levels; most offer first grade through eighth grade classes, while a few only offer classes through the sixth grade.

Adair County

Cave Springs Public Schools #30, Bunch
Dahlonegah Public School #29, Stilwell
Maryetta Public School #22, Stilwell
Peavine Public School #19, Stilwell
Rocky Mountain Public School #24, Stilwell
Stilwell Public Schools #25, Stilwell
Watts Public Schools #4, Watts
Westville Public Schools #11, Westville
Zion Public School #28, Stilwell

Alfalfa County

Burlington Public Schools #1, Burlington
Cherokee Public Schools #46, Cherokee
Timberlake Public Schools #93, Helena

Atoka County

Atoka Public Schools #15, Atoka
Caney Public Schools #26, Caney
Harmony Public School #21, Atoka
Lane Public School #22, Lane
Stringtown Public Schools #7, Stringtown
Tushka Public Schools #19, Atoka

Beaver County

Balko Public Schools #75, Balko
Beaver Public Schools #22, Beaver
Forgan Public Schools #123, Forgan
Turpin Public Schools #128, Turpin

Beckham County

Elk City Public Schools #6, Elk City
Erick Public Schools #51, Erick
Merritt Public Schools #2, Elk City
Sayre Public Schools #31, Sayre

Blaine County

Canton Public Schools #105, Canton
Geary Public Schools #80, Geary
Okeene Public Schools #9, Okeene
Watonga Public Schools #42, Watonga

Bryan County

Achille Public Schools #3, Achille
Bennington Public Schools #40, Bennington
Caddo Public Schools #5, Caddo
Calera Public Schools #48, Calera
Colbert Public Schools #4, Colbert
Durant Independent School District #72, Durant
Rock Creek Public Schools #2, Bokchito
Silo Public Schools #1, Durant

Caddo County

Anadarko Public Schools #20, Anadarko
Binger-Oney Public Schools #168, Binger
Boone-Apache Public Schools #56, Apache
Carnegie Public Schools #33, Carnegie
Cement Public Schools #160, Cement
Cyril Public Schools #64, Cyril
Fort Cobb-Broxton Public Schools #167, Fort Cobb
Gracemont Public Schools #86, Gracemont
Hinton Public Schools #161, Hinton
Hydro-Eakly Public Schools #11, Hydro
Lookeba-Sickles Public Schools #12, Lookeba

Canadian County

Banner Public School #31, El Reno
Calumet Public Schools #76, Calumet
Darlington Public School #70, El Reno
El Reno Public Schools #34, El Reno
Maple Public School #162, Calumet
Mustang Public Schools #69, Mustang
Piedmont Public Schools #22, Piedmont
Riverside Public Schools #29, El Reno
Union City Public Schools #57, Union City
Yukon Public Schools #27, Yukon

Carter County

Ardmore City Schools #19, Ardmore
Dickson Public Schools #77, Ardmore
Fox Public Schools #74, Fox
Healdton Public Schools #55, Healdton
Lone Grove Public Schools #32, Lone Grove
Plainview Public Schools #27, Ardmore
Springer Public Schools #21, Springer
Wilson Public Schools #43, Wilson
Zaneis Public School #72, Wilson

Cherokee County

Briggs Public School #44, Tahlequah
Grand View Public School #34, Tahlequah
Hulbert Public Schools #16, Hulbert
Keys Public Schools #6, Park Hill
Lowrey Public School #10, Tahlequah
Norwood Public Schools #14, Hulbert
Peggs Public School #31, Peggs
Shady Grove Public School #26, Hulbert
Tahlequah Public Schools #35, Tahlequah
Tenkiller Public School #66, Welling
Woodall Public School #21, Tahlequah

Choctaw County

Boswell Public Schools #1, Boswell
Fort Towson Public Schools #2, Fort Towson
Hugo Public Schools #39, Hugo
Soper Public Schools #4, Soper

Cimarron County

Boise City Public Schools #2, Boise City
Felt Public Schools #10, Felt

Cleveland County

Lexington Public Schools #57, Lexington
Little Axe Public Schools #70, Norman
Moore Public Schools #2, Moore
Noble Public Schools #40, Noble
Norman Public Schools #29, Norman
Robin Hill Public School #16, Norman

Coal County

Coalgate Public Schools #1, Coalgate
Cottonwood Public School #4, Coalgate
Tupelo Public Schools #2, Tupelo

Comanche County

Bishop Public School #49, Lawton
Cache Public Schools #1, Cache
Chattanooga Public Schools #132, Chattanooga
Elgin Public Schools #16, Elgin
Fletcher Public Schools #9, Fletcher
Flower Mound Public School #48, Lawton
Geronimo Public Schools #4, Geronimo
Indiahoma Public Schools #2, Indiahoma
Lawton Public Schools #8, Lawton
Sterling Public Schools #3, Sterling

Cotton County

Big Pasture Public Schools #333, Randlett
Temple Public Schools #101, Temple
Walters Public Schools #1, Walters

Craig County

Bluejacket Public Schools #20, Bluejacket
Ketchum Public Schools #6, Ketchum
Vinita Public Schools #65, Vinita
Welch Public Schools #17, Welch
White Oak Public Schools #1, Vinita

Creek County

Allen-Bowden Public School #35, Tulsa
Bristow Public Schools #2, Bristow
Depew Public Schools #21, Depew
Drumright Public Schools #39, Drumright
Gypsy Public School #12, Depew
Kellyville Public Schools #31, Kellyville
Kiefer Public Schools #18, Kiefer
Lone Star Public School #8, Sapulpa
Mannford Public Schools #3, Mannford
Mounds Public Schools #5, Mounds
Oilton Public Schools #20, Oilton
Olive Public Schools #17, Drumright
Pretty Water Public School #34, Sapulpa
Sapulpa Public Schools #33, Sapulpa

Custer County

Arapaho-Butler Public School District #5, Arapaho
Clinton Public Schools #99, Clinton
Thomas-Fay-Custer Unified School District #7, Thomas
Weatherford Public Schools #26, Weatherford

Delaware County

Cleora Public School #6, Afton
Colcord Public Schools #4, Colcord
Grove Public Schools #2, Grove
Jay Public Schools #1, Jay
Kansas Public Schools #3, Kansas
Kenwood Public School #30, Salina
Leach Public School #14, Twin Oaks
Moseley Public School #34, Colcord
Oaks-Mission Public Schools #5, Oaks

Dewey County

Seiling Public Schools #8, Seiling
Taloga Public Schools #10, Taloga
Vici Public Schools #5, Vici

Ellis County

Arnett Public Schools #3, Arnett
Fargo Public Schools #2, Fargo
Shattuck Public Schools #42, Shattuck

Garfield County

Chisholm Public Schools #42, Enid
Covington-Douglas Public Schools #94, Covington
Drummond Public Schools #85, Drummond
Enid Public Schools #57, Enid
Garber Public Schools #47, Garber
Kremlin-Hillsdale Public Schools #18, Kremlin
Pioneer-Pleasant Vale Schools #56, Waukomis
Waukomis Public Schools #1, Waukomis

Garvin County

Elmore City-Pernell Schools #72, Elmore City
Lindsay Public Schools #9, Lindsay
Maysville Public Schools #7, Maysville
Paoli Public Schools #5, Paoli
Pauls Valley Public Schools #18, Pauls Valley
Stratford Public Schools #2, Stratford
Whitebead Public School #16, Pauls Valley
Wynnewood Public Schools #38, Wynnewood

Grady County

Alex Public Schools #56, Alex
Amber-Pocasset Public Schools #128, Amber
Bridge Creek Public Schools #95, Blanchard
Chickasha Public Schools #1, Chickasha
Friend Public School #37, Chickasha
Middleberg Public School #96, Blanchard
Minco Public Schools #2, Minco
Ninnekah Public Schools #51, Ninnekah
Pioneer Public School #131, Chickasha
Rush Springs Public Schools #68, Rush Springs
Tuttle Public Schools #97, Tuttle
Verden Public Schools #99, Verden

Grant County

Deer Creek-Lamont Public Schools #95, Lamont
Medford Public Schools #54, Medford
Pond Creek-Hunter Public Schools #90, Pond Creek

Greer County

Granite Public Schools #3, Granite
Mangum Public Schools #1, Mangum

Harmon County
Hollis Public Schools #66, Hollis

Harper County

Buffalo Public Schools #4, Buffalo
Laverne Public Schools #1, Laverne

Haskell County

Keota Public Schools #43, Keota
Kinta Public Schools #13, Kinta
McCurtain Public Schools #37, McCurtain
Stigler Public Schools #20, Stigler
Whitefield Public School #10, Whitefield

Hughes County

Calvin Public Schools #48, Calvin
Holdenville Public Schools #35, Holdenville
Moss Public Schools #1, Holdenville
Stuart Public Schools #54, Stuart
Wetumka Public Schools #5, Wetumka

Jackson County

Altus Public Schools #18, Altus
Blair Public Schools #54, Blair
Duke Public Schools #14, Duke
Navajo Public Schools #1, Altus
Olustee-Eldorado Public Schools #40, Olustee

Jefferson County

Ringling Public Schools #14, Ringling
Ryan Public Schools #1, Ryan
Terral Public School #3, Terral
Waurika Public Schools #23, Waurika

Johnston County

Coleman Public Schools #35, Coleman
Mannsville Public School #7, Mannsville
Milburn Public Schools #29, Milburn
Mill Creek Public Schools #2, Mill Creek
Ravia Public School #10, Ravia
Tishomingo Public Schools #20, Tishomingo
Wapanucka Public Schools #37, Wapanucka

Kay County

Blackwell Public Schools #45, Blackwell
Kildare Public School #50, Ponca City
Newkirk Public Schools #125, Newkirk
Peckham Public School #27, Newkirk
Ponca City Public Schools #71, Ponca City
Tonkawa Public Schools #87, Tonkawa

Kingfisher County

Cashion Public Schools #89, Cashion
Dover Public Schools #2, Dover
Hennessey Public Schools #16, Hennessey
Kingfisher Public Schools #7, Kingfisher
Lomega Public Schools #3, Omega
Okarche Public Schools #105, Okarche

Kiowa County

Hobart Public Schools #1, Hobart
Lone Wolf Public Schools #2, Lone Wolf
Mountain View-Gotebo Schools #3, Mountain View
Snyder Public Schools #4, Snyder

Latimer County

Buffalo Valley Public Schools #3, Talihina
Panola Public Schools #4, Panola
Red Oak Public Schools #2, Red Oak
Wilburton Public Schools #1, Wilburton

LeFlore County

Arkoma Public Schools #91, Arkoma
Bokoshe Public Schools #26, Bokoshe
Cameron Public Schools #17, Cameron
Fanshawe Public School #39, Fanshawe
Heavener Public Schools #3, Heavener
Hodgen Public School #14, Hodgen
Howe Public Schools #67, Howe
Le Flore Public Schools #16, Le Flore
Monroe Public School #11, Monroe
Panama Public Schools #20, Panama
Pocola Public Schools #7, Pocola
Poteau Public Schools #29, Poteau
Shady Point Public School #4, Shady Point
Spiro Public Schools #2, Spiro
Talihina Public Schools #52, Talihina
Whitesboro Public Schools #62, Whitesboro
Wister Public Schools #49, Wister

Lincoln County

Agra Public Schools #134, Agra
Carney Public Schools #105, Carney
Chandler Public Schools #1, Chandler
Davenport Public Schools #3, Davenport
Meeker Public Schools #95, Meeker
Prague Public Schools #103, Prague
Stroud Public Schools #54, Stroud
Wellston Public Schools #4, Wellston
White Rock Public School #5, McLoud

Logan County

Coyle Public Schools #14, Coyle
Crescent Public Schools #2, Crescent
Guthrie Public Schools #1, Guthrie
Mulhall-Orlando Public Schools #3, Orlando

Love County

Greenville Public School #3, Marietta
Marietta Public Schools #16, Marietta
Thackerville Public Schools #4, Thackerville
Turner Public Schools #5, Burneyville

Major County

Aline-Cleo Public Schools #4, Aline
Cimarron Public Schools #92, Lahoma
Fairview Public Schools #84, Fairview
Ringwood Public Schools #1, Ringwood

Marshall County

Kingston Public Schools #3, Kingston
Madill Public Schools #2, Madill

Mayes County

Adair Public Schools #2, Adair
Chouteau-Mazie Public Schools #32, Chouteau
Locust Grove Public Schools #17, Locust Grove
Osage Public School #43, Pryor
Pryor Public Schools #1, Pryor
Salina Public Schools #16, Salina
Wickliffe Public School #35, Salina

McIntosh County

Checotah Public Schools #19, Checotah
Eufaula Public Schools #1, Eufaula
Hanna Public Schools #64, Hanna
Midway Public Schools #27, Council Hill
Ryal Public School #3, Henryetta
Stidham Public School #16, Eufaula

McClain County

Blanchard Public Schools #29, Blanchard
Dibble Public Schools #2, Dibble
Newcastle Public Schools #1, Newcastle
Purcell Public Schools #15, Purcell
Washington Public Schools #5, Washington
Wayne Public Schools #10, Wayne

McCurtain County

Battiest Public Schools #71, Battiest
Broken Bow Public Schools #74, Broken Bow
Denison Public School #37, Idabel
Eagletown Public Schools #13, Eagletown
Forest Grove Public School #1, Garvin
Glover Public School #23, Broken Bow
Haworth Public Schools #6, Haworth
Holly Creek Public School #72, Broken Bow
Idabel Public Schools #5, Idabel
Lukfata Public School #9, Broken Bow
Smithville Public Schools #14, Smithville
Valliant Public Schools #11, Valliant
Wright City Public Schools #39, Wright City

Murray County

Davis Public Schools #10, Davis
Sulphur Public Schools #1, Sulphur

Muskogee County

Braggs Public Schools #46, Braggs
Fort Gibson Public Schools #3, Fort Gibson
Haskell Public Schools #2, Haskell
Hilldale Public Schools #29, Muskogee
Muskogee Public Schools #20, Muskogee
Oktaha Public Schools #8, Oktaha
Porum Public Schools #88, Porum
Wainwright Public School #9, Wainwright
Warner Public Schools #74, Warner
Webbers Falls Public Schools #6, Webbers Falls

Noble County

Billings Public Schools #2, Billings
Frontier Public Schools #4, Red Rock
Morrison Public Schools #6, Morrison
Perry Public Schools #1, Perry

Nowata County

Nowata Public Schools #40, Nowata
Oklahoma Union Public Schools #3, South Coffeyville
South Coffeyville Public Schools #51, South Coffeyville

Okfuskee County

Bearden Public School #29, Okemah
Graham-Dustin Public Schools #54, Weleetka
Mason Public Schools #2, Mason
Okemah Public Schools #26, Okemah
Paden Public Schools #14, Paden
Weleetka Public Schools #31, Weleetka

Oklahoma County

Bethany Public Schools #88, Bethany
Choctaw-Nicoma Park School District #4, Choctaw
Crooked Oak Public Schools #53, Oklahoma City
Crutcho Public School #74, Oklahoma City
Deer Creek Public Schools #6, Edmond
Edmond Public Schools #12, Edmond
Harrah Public Schools #7, Harrah
Jones Public Schools #9, Jones
Luther Public Schools #3, Luther
Mid-Del School District #52, Midwest City
Millwood Public Schools #37, Oklahoma City
Oakdale Public School #29, Edmond
Oklahoma City Public Schools #89, Oklahoma City
Putnam City School District #1, Warr Acres
Western Heights Public Schools #41, Oklahoma City

Okmulgee County

Beggs Independent School District #4, Beggs
Dewar Public Schools #8, Dewar
Henryetta Public Schools #2, Henryetta
Morris Public Schools #3, Morris
Okmulgee Public Schools #1, Okmulgee
Preston Public Schools #5, Preston
Schulter Public Schools #6, Schulter
Twin Hills Public School #11, Okmulgee
Wilson Public Schools #7, Henryetta

Osage County

Anderson School District #52, Sand Springs
Avant Independent School District #35, Avant
Barnsdall Indepentent School District #29, Barnsdall
Bowring Public School #7, Bowring
Hominy Public Schools #38, Hominy
McCord Public School #77, Ponca City
Osage Hills Public School #3, Bartlesville
Pawhuska Public Schools #2, Pawhuska
Prue Public Schools #50, Prue
Shidler Public Schools #11, Shidler
Woodland Public Schools #90, Fairfax
Wynona Public Schools #30, Wynona

Ottawa County

Afton Independent School District #26, Afton
Commerce Public Schools #18, Commerce
Fairland Public Schools #31, Fairland
Miami Public Schools #23, Miami
Quapaw Public Schools #14, Quapaw
Turkey Ford Public School #10, Wyandotte
Wyandotte Public Schools #1, Wyandotte

Pawnee County

Cleveland Public Schools #6, Cleveland
Jennings Public School #2, Jennings
Pawnee Public Schools #1, Pawnee

Payne County

Cushing Public Schools #67, Cushing
Glencoe Public Schools #101, Glencoe
Oak Grove Public School #104, Cushing
Perkins-Tryon Public Schools #56, Perkins
Ripley Public Schools #3, Ripley
Stillwater Public Schools #16, Stillwater
Yale Public Schools #103, Yale

Pittsburg County

Canadian Public Schools #2, Canadian
Crowder Public Schools #28, Crowder
Frink-Chambers Public School #29, McAlester
Haileyville Public Schools #11, Haileyville
Hartshorne Public Schools #1, Hartshorne
Haywood Public School #88, Haywood
Indianola Public Schools #25, Indianola
Kiowa Public Schools #14, Kiowa
Krebs Public School #9, Krebs
McAlester Public Schools #80, McAlester
Pittsburg Public Schools #63, Pittsburg
Quinton Public Schools #17, Quinton
Savanna Public Schools #30, Savanna
Tannehill Public School #56, McAlester

Pontotoc County

Ada Independent School District #19, Ada
Allen Independent School District #1, Allen
Byng Public Schools #16, Ada
Latta Public Schools #24, Ada
Roff Public Schools #37, Roff
Stonewall Public Schools #30, Stonewall
Vanoss Public Schools #9, Ada

Pottawatomie County

Asher Public Schools #112, Asher
Bethel Public Schools #3, Shawnee
Dale Public Schools #2, Dale
Earlsboro Public Schools #5, Earlsboro
Grove Public School #27, Shawnee
Macomb Public Schools #4, Macomb
Maud Public Schools #117, Maud
McLoud Public Schools #1, McLoud
North Rock Creek Public School #10, Shawnee
Pleasant Grove Public School #29, Shawnee
Shawnee Public Schools #93, Shawnee
South Rock Creek Public School #32, Shawnee
Tecumseh Public Schools #92, Tecumseh
Wanette Public Schools #115, Wanette

Pushmataha County

Albion Public School #2, Albion
Antlers Public Schools #13, Antlers
Clayton Public Schools #10, Clayton
Moyers Public Schools #22, Moyers
Nashoba Public School #15, Nashoba
Rattan Public Schools #1, Rattan
Tuskahoma Public School #4, Tuskahoma

Roger Mills County

Cheyenne Public Schools #7, Cheyenne
Hammon Public Schools #66, Hammon
Leedey Public Schools #3, Leedey
Reydon Public Schools #6, Reydon
Sweetwater Public Schools #15, Sweetwater

Rogers County

Catoosa Public Schools #2, Catoosa
Chelsea Public Schools #3, Chelsea
Claremore Public Schools #1, Claremore
Foyil Public Schools #7, Foyil
Inola Public Schools #5, Inola
Justus-Tiawah Public School #9, Claremore
Oologah-Talala Public Schools #4, Oologah
Sequoyah Public Schools #6, Claremore
Verdigris Public Schools #8, Verdigris

Seminole County

Bowlegs Public Schools #3, Bowlegs
Butner Public Schools #15, Cromwell
Justice Public School #54, Wewoka
Konawa Public Schools #4, Konawa
New Lima Public Schools #6, Wewoka
Sasakwa Public Schools #10, Sasakwa
Seminole Public Schools #1, Seminole
Strother Public Schools #14, Seminole
Varnum Public Schools #7, Seminole
Wewoka Public Schools #2, Wewoka

Sequoyah County

Belfonte Public School #50, Muldrow
Brushy Public School #36, Sallisaw
Central Public Schools #7, Sallisaw
Gans Public Schools #4, Gans
Gore Public Schools #6, Gore
Liberty Public School #1, Roland
Marble City Public School #35, Marble City
Moffett Public School #68, Moffett
Muldrow Public Schools #3, Muldrow
Roland Public Schools #5, Roland
Sallisaw Public Schools #1, Sallisaw
Vian Public Schools #2, Vian

Stephens County

Bray-Doyle Public Schools #42, Marlow
Central High Public Schools #34, Marlow
Comanche Public Schools #2, Comanche
Duncan Public Schools #1, Duncan
Empire Public Schools #21, Duncan
Grandview Public School #82, Comanche
Marlow Public Schools #3, Marlow
Velma-Alma Public Schools #15, Velma

Texas County

Goodwell Public Schools #60, Goodwell
Guymon Public Schools #8, Guymon
Hardesty Public Schools #15, Hardesty
Hooker Public Schools #23, Hooker
Optima Public School #9, Optima
Straight Public School #80, Guymon
Texhoma Public Schools #61, Texhoma
Tyrone Public Schools #53, Tyrone
Yarbrough Public Schools #1, Goodwell

Tillman County

Davidson Public Schools #9, Davidson
Frederick Public Schools #158, Frederick
Grandfield Public Schools #249, Grandfield
Tipton Public Schools #8, Tipton

Tulsa County

Berryhill Public Schools #10, Tulsa
Bixby Public Schools #4, Bixby
Broken Arrow Public Schools #3, Broken Arrow
Collinsville Public Schools #6, Collinsville
Glenpool Public Schools #13, Glenpool
Jenks Public Schools #5, Jenks
Keystone Public School #15, Sand Springs
Liberty Public Schools #14, Mounds
Owasso Public Schools #11, Owasso
Sand Springs Public Schools #2, Sand Springs
Skiatook Public Schools #7, Skiatook
Sperry Public Schools #8, Sperry
Tulsa Public Schools #1, Tulsa
Union Public Schools #9, Tulsa

Wagoner County

Coweta Public Schools #17, Coweta
Okay Public Schools #1, Okay
Porter Consolidated Schools #365, Porter
Wagoner Public Schools #19, Wagoner

Washington County

Bartlesville Public Schools #30, Bartlesville
Caney Valley Public Schools #18, Ramona
Copan Public Schools #4, Copan
Dewey Public Schools #7, Dewey

Washita County

Burns Flat-Dill City Schools #10, Burns Flat
Canute Public Schools #11, Canute
Cordell Public Schools #78, Cordell
Sentinel Public Schools #1, Sentinel

Woods County

Alva Public Schools #1, Alva
Freedom Public Schools #6, Freedom
Waynoka Public Schools #3, Waynoka

Woodward County

Fort Supply Public Schools #5, Fort Supply
Mooreland Public Schools #2, Mooreland
Sharon-Mutual Public Schools #3, Mutual
Woodward Public Schools #1, Woodward

See also 
List of private schools in Oklahoma
List of vocational technical schools in Oklahoma
List of colleges and universities in Oklahoma

References

External sources 
Oklahoma State Department of Education

 
School districts
Oklahoma
School districts